The 1990 Buffalo Bulls football team represented the University at Buffalo as an independent during the 1990 NCAA Division III football season. Led by Sam Sanders in his  first season as head coach, the team compiled a record of 2–8.

Schedule

References

Buffalo
Buffalo Bulls football seasons
Buffalo Bulls football